Fikret Hodžić  (26 June 1953 – 9 July 1992) was a professional Bosnian bodybuilder. Hodžić competed during the 1970s and 1980s representing the Socialist Federal Republic of Yugoslavia.

Hodžić was murdered near his home by Serb paramilitaries during the early days of the Bosnian War. His remains were found in a mass grave in January 2009 and were properly buried on 20 July 2009, a full 17 years after his murder.

Hodžić began bodybuilding in 1973. He was inspired by Petar Čelik. He briefly had to stop training while completing mandatory military service. Hodžić was the bodybuilding champion of Yugoslavia for 15 consecutive years spanning 1976–1991. He was an advocate of training outdoors when weather permitted it. 

During the war he was killed near his home in Trnopolje in Bosnia by a Serbian soldier. His wife and two children sought refuge in Austria. After hearing of Hodžić's murder Arnold Schwarzenegger sent his condolences to the family. Fikret Hodžić's 20-year-old son Džemal was murdered in Sanski Most in 2000 by a local criminal.

International competitions
1981
European Amateur Championships - IFBB, Lightweight, 2nd
World Amateur Championships - IFBB, Lightweight, 3rd

1982
European Amateur Championships - IFBB, Lightweight, 5th
World Amateur Championships - IFBB, Lightweight, 4th

1986
European Amateur Championships - IFBB, Lightweight, 4th

1987
Mr Universe - NABBA, Short, 6th

1989
World Amateur Championships - IFBB, Lightweight, 13th

References 

1953 births
1992 deaths
Bosnia and Herzegovina bodybuilders
Deaths by firearm in Bosnia and Herzegovina
People murdered in Bosnia and Herzegovina
Bosniaks of Bosnia and Herzegovina
Civilians killed in the Bosnian War
1992 crimes in Bosnia and Herzegovina
1992 murders in Europe
1990s murders in Bosnia and Herzegovina